Garden High School is a private, English-medium, co-educational school in Kasba, Kolkata, West Bengal, India. It was established in 2000 by the Satikanta Guha Foundation.

Garden High School, IISER Kolkata Campus 
Garden High School has a branch in IISER Kolkata Campus, Mohanpur (near Kalyani). It was established in 2014, and follows the Central Board of Secondary Education.

References

External links 
 

High schools and secondary schools in Kolkata
Private schools in Kolkata
Primary schools in West Bengal
Educational institutions established in 2000
2000 establishments in West Bengal